Caloptilia megalotis is a moth of the family Gracillariidae. It is known from New South Wales, Australia and Meghalaya, India.

References

megalotis
Moths of Asia
Moths of Australia
Moths described in 1908